
Gmina Buczek is a rural gmina (administrative district) in Łask County, Łódź Voivodeship, in central Poland.

Villages
Gmina Buczek contains the villages and settlements of Bachorzyn, Brodnia Dolna, Brodnia Górna, Buczek, Czarny Las, Czestków A, Czestków B, Czestków F, Czestków-Osiedle, Dąbrowa, Dąbrówka, Grzeszyn, Gucin, Herbertów, Józefatów, Kowalew, Luciejów, Malenia, Petronelów, Sowińce, Strupiny, Sycanów, Wilkowyja, Wola Bachorska and Wola Buczkowska.

Neighbouring gminas
Gmina Buczek is bordered by the gminas of Łask, Sędziejowice and Zelów.

References
Polish official population figures 2006

Buczek
Łask County